Hiraga (written: 平賀) is a Japanese surname. Notable people with the surname include:

, Japanese pharmacologist, writer, painter and inventor
, Japanese samurai
, Imperial Japanese Navy admiral, engineer and naval architect

Fictional characters
, protagonist and the light novel series The Familiar of Zero

Japanese-language surnames